Avraham ben Yosef HaLevi Segal ( 1620 –  1670) was a Polish commentator born in Cracow. In consequence of the persecution of the Jews of Poland by the Cossacks in 1656, he fled from his native city and sought asylum in Hamburg. There he wrote a commentary on Megillas Taanis, which was printed in Amsterdam, in 1659, and went through several editions. His work, however, was not favorably received by his contemporaries, for both Efraim Cohen, author of Sha'ar Efraim, a collection of rabbinical decisions, and Abraham Gombiner, author of Magen Avraham, refer to him somewhat disparagingly.

He died, probably in Hamburg, about 1670, or at least some time after 1659.

References 
 Jewish Encyclopedia bibliography: Michael, Or ha-Ḥayyim, No. 124.

17th-century Polish rabbis
1620s births
1670s deaths
17th-century German rabbis
German Orthodox rabbis
Polish Orthodox rabbis
Rabbis from Kraków
Jewish refugees
Levites